CTCP may refer to:

 California Tobacco Control Program, a branch in the California Department of Public Health (CDPH)
 Client-to-client protocol, a type of communication between Internet Relay Chat (IRC) clients
 Compound TCP, a Microsoft algorithm included in Windows Vista
 Composite toe and composite plate, a type of safety footwear
 Công ty cổ phần, a limited company in Vietnamese
 SCNU Couse Teaching